Hekou, meaning river mouth or estuary, is a common place name in China and may refer to the following in China:

Districts (河口区)
 Hekou District, Dongying, Shandong

Counties (河口县)
 Hekou Yao Autonomous County (河口瑶族自治县), of Honghe Hani and Yi Autonomous Prefecture, Yunnan

Towns

(河口镇)
 Hekou, Huoqiu County, in Huoqiu County, Anhui
 Hekou, Foshan, in Sanshui District, Foshan, Guangdong
 Hekou, Luhe County, in Luhe County, Guangdong
 Hekou, Yangchun, in Yangchun City, Guangdong
 Hekou, Yunan County, in Yunan County, Guangdong
 Hekou, Dawu County, Hubei, in Dawu County, Hubei
 Hekou, Huangshi, in Xisaishan District, Huangshi, Hubei
 Hekou, Xiangtan County, in Xiangtan County, Hunan
 Hekou, Pei County, in Pei County, Jiangsu
 Hekou, Rudong County, in Rudong County, Jiangsu
 Hekou, Yanshan County, in Yanshan County, Jiangxi
 Hekou, Feng County, in Feng County, Shaanxi
 Hekou, Jiangyou, in Jiangyou City, Sichuan
 Hekou, Rong County, Sichuan, in Rong County, Sichuan
 Hekou, Wanyuan, in Wanyuan City, Sichuan
 Hekou, Yajiang County, in Yajiang County, Sichuan
 Hekou, Hekou County, in Hekou Yao Autonomous County, Yunnan
 Hekou, Xundian County, in Xundian Hui and Yi Autonomous County, Yunnan

(合口镇)
 Hekou, Linli, a town in Linli County, Hunan Province, China

Townships (河口乡)
 Hekou Township, Lanzhou, in Xigu District, Lanzhou, Gansu
 Hekou Township, Daozhen County, in Daozhen Gelao and Miao Autonomous County, Guizhou
 Hekou Township, Jinping County, in Jinping County, Guizhou
 Hekou Township, Shunping County, in Shunping County, Hebei
 Hekou Township, Yuan'an County, in Yuan'an County, Hubei
 Hekou, Sangzhi, in Sangzhi County, Hunan
 Hekou Township, Lan County, in Lan County, Shanxi
 Hekou Township, Huili County, in Huili County, Sichuan
 Hekou Township, Renshou County, in Renshou County, Sichuan

Villages (河口村)
 Hekou Village in Togtoh County, Inner Mongolia

Subdistricts (河口街道)
 Hekou Subdistrict, Yunfu, in Yuncheng District, Yunfu, Guangdong
 Hekou Subdistrict, Baishan, in Hunjiang District, Baishan, Jilin
 Hekou Subdistrict, Dongying, in Hekou District, Dongying, Shandong

Other uses
Hekou Group, geological formation in Gansu